Mount Lindesay National Park is a national park in the Great Southern Region of Western Australia. It was designated in 2004, and covers an area of 395.73 km2. It is part of the larger Walpole Wilderness Area that was established in the same year.

It is bounded on the north and north west by Mount Roe National Park.

It straddles two ecoregions – the Jarrah-Karri forest and shrublands cover the southern portion of the park and extend to the coast, and Southwest Australia woodlands cover the northern portion of the park.

The park is the easternmost in the Walpole Wilderness Area, which was designated in 2004 and includes several other national parks and reserves.

References

External link
 Mount Lindesay National Park, Parks and Wildlife Service, Government of Western Australia

National parks of Western Australia
Great Southern (Western Australia)
Southwest Australia
Protected areas established in 2004
2004 establishments in Australia
Warren bioregion